Grace Ravlin (15 April 1873 – 25 September 1956) was an American painter, known for painting the exotic locations where she traveled.

Life and career

A native of Kaneville, Illinois, Ravlin studied under John Vanderpoel at the School of the Art Institute of Chicago, and under William Merritt Chase at the Pennsylvania Academy of the Fine Arts. In Paris she took lessons with Émile-René Ménard and Lucien Simon. She traveled and painted widely during her time in France, visiting many places both in Europe and in North Africa. She was a member of numerous organizations, including the Société Nationale des Beaux-Arts, the Société des Peintres Orientalistes Français, and the Salon d'Automne. Among the awards which she received were the third medal at the Amis des Arts of Toulon in 1911; the silver medal at the Panama Pacific International Exposition in 1915; and the Field and Butler prizes at the Art Institute of Chicago in 1922. Besides the Institute, examples of her work may be found in the Musée du Luxembourg, the Newark Museum, the Los Angeles County Museum of Art, and the Smithsonian American Art Museum, among others. Ravlin described herself as an "ethnographic painter", and her chief subject was the exotic locations to which she traveled.

Ravlin died in Plano, Illinois. Many of her letters have survived in private archives. In 2018, a 1920 Ravlin painting appeared on Antiques Roadshow, where it was appraised at between $15,000 and $20,000.

See also

List of Orientalist artists
Orientalism

References

1873 births
1956 deaths
American women painters
20th-century American painters
20th-century American women artists
School of the Art Institute of Chicago alumni
Pennsylvania Academy of the Fine Arts alumni
Students of William Merritt Chase
People from Kane County, Illinois
Orientalist painters
Painters from Illinois
People from Plano, Illinois